Quinton is an unincorporated community in Walker County, Alabama, United States, located  south-southeast of Dora. Quinton has a post office with ZIP code 35130, which opened on March 27, 1888.

References

Unincorporated communities in Walker County, Alabama
Unincorporated communities in Alabama